The Gülen movement, or Hizmet movement, or Fethullah Gülen movement, referred to by its participants as Hizmet ("service") or Cemaat ("community") and since 2016 by the Government of Turkey as FETÖ ("Fethullahist Terrorist Organisation" or, more commonly, "Fethullah Terrorist Organisation"), is an Islamist fraternal movement led by Fethullah Gülen, a Muslim preacher who has lived in the United States since 1999. The movement is designated as a terrorist organization by Turkey, Pakistan, Northern Cyprus, and the Gulf Cooperation Council. Owing to the outlawed status of the Gülen movement in Turkey, some observers refer to the movement's volunteers who are Turkish Muslims as effectively a sub-sect of Sunni Islam; these volunteers generally hold their religious tenets as generically Turkish Sunni Islam.

A U.S.-based umbrella foundation which is affiliated with the movement is the Alliance for Shared Values. The movement has attracted supporters and drawn the attention of critics in Turkey, Central Asia, and other parts of the world. It is active in education and operates private schools and universities in over 180 countries. It has initiated forums for interfaith dialogue. It has substantial investments in media, finance, and for-profit health clinics. Despite its teachings which are stated conservative in Turkey, some have praised the movement as a pacifist, modern-oriented version of Islam, and an alternative to more extreme schools of Islam such as Salafism. But it has also been reported of having a "cultish hierarchy" and of being a secretive Islamic sect.

The Gülen movement is a former ally of the Turkish Justice and Development Party (AKP). When the AKP came to power in 2002 the two formed, despite their differences, a tactical alliance against military tutelage and the Turkish secular elite. It was through this alliance that the AKP had accomplished an unprecedented feat in Turkish republican history by securing national electoral victories sufficient to form three consecutive majority governments in 2002, 2007, and 2011. The Gülen movement gained influence on the Turkish police force and the judiciary during its alliance with conservative President Erdoğan, which saw hundreds of Gülen supporters appointed to positions within the Turkish government. Once the old establishment was defeated around 2010 to 2011 disagreements emerged between the AKP and the Gülen movement. The first breaking point was the so-called ″MIT crisis″ of February 2012, it was also interpreted as a power struggle between pro-Gülen police and judiciary and the AKP. After the 2013 corruption investigations in Turkey into stated corrupt practices by several bureaucrats, ministers, mayors, and family members of the ruling AKP of Turkey was uncovered, President Recep Tayyip Erdoğan blamed the movement for initiating the investigations as a result of a break in previously friendly relations. President Erdoğan said Gülen attempted to overthrow the Turkish government through a judicial coup by the use of corruption investigations and seized the group-owned newspaper (Zaman— one of the most circulated newspapers in Turkey before the seizure) and several companies that have ties with the group.

Since May 2016, the Gülen movement has been classified as a terrorist organization by Turkey under the assigned names Fethullahist Terrorist Organization (FETÖ) and Parallel State Structure (PDY). After the failed coup attempt in 2016, the government of Turkey blamed the group for the coup and authorities have arrested thousands of soldiers and judges. Over ten thousand education staff were suspended and the licenses of over 20,000 teachers working at private institutions were revoked for stated affiliation to Gülen. Fethullah Gülen condemned the coup and denied any involvement.

Description and membership
The movement states that it is based on moral values and advocacy of universal access to education, civil society, tolerance and peace. The emphasis among participants is to perform "service" (also the meaning of the Turkish word "hizmet") as arising from individuals' personal commitments to righteous imperatives. Along with hizmet, the movement, which has no official name, is termed the Gülen movement or cemaat (the latter also used to describe participants in Sufi orders, meaning "congregation," "community," or "assembly.") The movement has been characterized as a "moderate blend of Islam". Gülen and the Gülen movement are technology-friendly, work within current market and commerce structures, and are savvy users of modern communications and public relations. In 2008, Gülen was described as "the modern face of the Sufi Ottoman tradition", who reassures his followers, including many members of "Turkey's aspirational middle class", that "they can combine the statist-nationalist beliefs of Atatürk’s republic with a traditional but flexible Islamic faith" and "Ottoman traditions that had been caricatured as theocratic by Atatürk and his 'Kemalist' heirs".

In the early 2000s, the Gülen movement was seen as keeping a distance from established Islamic political parties.

Sources state that the Gülen movement is vying to be recognized as the world's leading Muslim network, one that is more reasonable than many of its rivals. The movement builds on the activities of Gülen, who has won praise from non-Muslim quarters for his advocacy of science, interfaith dialogue, and multi-party democracy. It has earned praise as "the world's most global movement".

"It is impossible to calculate the size of the Gülen movement" since the movement is not a centralized or formal organization with membership rosters, but rather a set of numerous, loosely organized networks of people inspired by Gülen. Estimates of the size of the movement vary, with one source stating that between 200,000 supporters and 4 million people are influenced by Gülen's ideas (1997 Tempo estimate), and another stating that Gülen has "hundreds of thousands of supporters". The membership of the movement consists primarily of students, teachers, businessmen, academics, journalists and other professionals. Its members have founded schools, universities, an employers' association, charities, real estate trusts, student organizations, radio and television stations, and newspapers.

The movement's structure has been described as a flexible organizational network. Movement schools and businesses organize locally and link themselves into informal networks. Akin to Turkey's Sufi tariqas (lay religious orders), banned in Turkey in 1925, The movement skirted Kemalist Turkey's prohibitions against assembling in non-state sponsored religious meetings. (As a young man, future President of Turkey Recep Tayyip Erdoğan belonged to the Naqshbandi tariqa, then technically banned in Turkey.)

Each local Gülen movement school and community has a person designated its "informal" (in the sense of not being Turkish state-sponsored) prayer leader (imam). In the Gülen movement, this individual is a layman who serves for a stint within this volunteer position. His identity is kept confidential, generally only purposely made known to those with close connections to those participating in decision-making and coordinating councils within the local group. Above a grouping of such "secret" (not-publicly-acknowledged) imams is another such volunteer leader. This relationship tree continues on up the ladder to the nation-level imam and to individuals who consult with Gülen himself. (These individuals closest to Gülen, having degrees from theology schools, are offhandedly referred to within the movement as mullahs.) Gülen's position, as described in the foregoing, is analogous to that of a shaykh (master) of a Sufi tariqa. Unlike with traditional tariqas, no-one makes pledges of any sort, upon joining the Gülen movement; one becomes a movement participant simply by working with others to promote and effect the movement's objectives of education and service.

The Gülen movement works within the given structures of modern secular states; it encourages affiliated members to maximize the opportunities those countries afford rather than engaging in subversive activities. In the words of the leader himself and the title of a cornerstone of his philosophy, Gülen promotes "an Ottoman Empire of the Mind".

Detractors of the movement "have labeled Gülen community members as secretive missionaries, while those in the Movement and sympathetic observers class it as a civil society organization".

Critics have complained that members of the Gülen movement are overly compliant to the directions from its leaders, and Gülen's "movement is generally perceived by its critics as a religio-political cult". The Guardian editorial board described the movement in 2013 as having "some of the characteristics of a cult or of an Islamic Opus Dei".

Scholars such as Simon Robinson disagree with the characterization, writing that although "[t]here is no doubt that Gülen remains a charismatic leader and that members of the movement hold him in the highest respect", the movement "differs markedly from a cult in several ways", with Gülen stressing "the primacy of the scriptures" and "the imperative of service" and consistently avoiding "attempts to institutionalize power, to perceive him as the source of all truth, or to view him as taking responsibility for the movement". Zeki Saritoprak says that the view of Gülen as "a cult leader or a man with ambitions" is mistaken, and contends that Gülen should be viewed in the context of a long line of Sufi masters who have long been a center of attention "for their admirers and followers, both historically and currently".

Beginning in 2008, the Dutch government investigated the movement's activities in the Netherlands in response to questions from Parliament. The first two investigations, performed by the AIVD, concluded that the movement did not form a breeding ground for radicalism and found no indications that the movement worked against integration or that it was involved in terrorism or religious radicalization. A further academic study sketched a portrait of a socially conservative, inwardly directed movement with an opaque organizational structure, but said that its members tend to be highly successful in society and thus form no threat to integration.

Hizmet-affiliated foundations and businesses were estimated as worth $20-to-$50 billion in 2015.

Socio-economic activities

Schools

The movement is active in education (kindergarten–university) as well as civic opportunities in other areas such as for interfaith dialogue, humanitarian aid, media, finance, and health. Most Gülen Movement schools are private. By 2017, it was estimated 1.2 million Turks have passed through Hizmet schools (including Turkish prime minister Recep Tayyip Erdogan's son in-law, Berat Albayrak); and its educational footprint extends to over 160 countries. In 2009, it was estimated that members of the Gülen Movement ran schools around the world in which more than two million students were enrolled. Estimates of the number of schools and educational institutions vary widely; it appears there are about 300 Gülen Movement schools in Turkey and over 1,000 schools worldwide.

Beyond the borders of Turkey, many Gülen schools can be found in countries with large populations of people of Turkish descent. Gülen schools in predominantly non-Turkish Muslim countries provide families with an alternative to madrasa education.

Gülen schools have received both criticism and praise.

In June 2021, the Turkish-Kyrgyz educator and the head of the Sapat educational network in Kyrgyzstan, Orhan Inandi, went missing from the Kyrgyz capital Bishkek, leading to mass protests. Inandi, 53, had lived in Kyrgyzstan since 1995, and holds dual Turkish-Kyrgyz citizenship. One month later, Turkish President Recep Tayyip Erdogan said on July 5 that Turkish intelligence agents had abducted Inandi, accusing him of being “a top Central Asian leader” of the Gülen movement led by U.S.-based Turkish cleric Fethullah Gülen. Kyrgyz officials have denied claims they colluded with Turkish intelligence to abduct a Turkish-Kyrgyz educator who disappeared from Bishkek.

Charter schools in the United States

In 2011, it was estimated that over 120 charter schools in the United States in 25 states were operated by participants of the Gülen movement. The largest numbers of such schools were in Texas (60 schools, Harmony schools, run by the Cosmos Foundation); Ohio (19 schools, known as Horizon Science Academies and operated by Concept Schools Inc.); and California (14 schools, operated by the Magnolia Foundation). The Philadelphia Inquirer reported at the time that Gülen schools were one of the largest users of H1B visas, receiving approval for 684 such visas in 2009. The Inquirer reported that the FBI, Labor Department, and Education Department were investigating whether some charter school employees employed via H1B visas misused funds by kicking back a portion of their salaries to movement groups. The investigation had no tie to terrorism, and there was "no indication the American charter network has a religious agenda in the classroom".

A 60 Minutes episode profiled Gülen movement-operated charter schools in the U.S. in May 2012. The profile estimated that there were about 130 affiliated schools nationwide, with about 36 Harmony School in Texas, serving "mostly underprivileged students" and all emphasizing math and science. The episode said that the schools generally received high marks for the quality of education, but also said that Gülen's reclusive nature "invites conspiracy theories that he's running Turkey from the Poconos and is bent on global Muslim domination" and that "[o]ne statement involves immigration fraud: that the schools are providing work visas for hundreds of Gülen followers from Turkey."

Professor Joshua Hendrick of Loyola University Maryland, who studies the movement, said that Gülen himself "does not have a direct hand in operating" the charter schools, and it was reported that Gülen has never visited the schools. The Harmony Schools in Texas do not teach religion, and the charter network says that some 7.8% of its teachers are non-Americans.

The Wall Street Journal reported in 2016 that around 150 U.S. charter schools were tied to the Gülen movement, "ranging from networks in Texas, Illinois and Florida to stand-alone academies in Maryland". The Journal stated that like other charter schools "blacks and Hispanics in underserved neighborhoods" made up the majority of the student body, with common themes including "an emphasis on math and science education, Turkish language classes and sponsored trips to Turkey". Hendrick said that in the upheaval following the 2016 Turkish coup attempt, proposed new charter schools and charters up for renewal "that are run by Turkish-Americans and are said to be connected with the cleric" could run into increased opposition, as the Turkish government has sought "to bring down Mr. Gülen through U.S. charter schools they claim are connected to him".

Dialogue

The movement's avowal of interfaith dialogue grew out of Gülen's personal engagement in interfaith dialogue, largely inspired by the example of one of his influences, Said Nursi. Gülen has met with leaders of other religions, including Pope John Paul II, the Ecumenical Patriarch Bartholomew I, and Israeli Sephardic Head Rabbi Eliyahu Bakshi-Doron. Gülen advocates cooperation between followers of different religions as well as those practicing different forms of Islam (such as Sunnism or Alevism).

Gülen's call for interfaith dialogue has influenced three generations of movement followers.

Gülen movement participants have founded a number of institutions across the World that promote interfaith and intercultural dialogue activities. Among these are the Journalists and Writers Foundation in Istanbul, the Rumi Forum in Washington and the Indialogue Foundation in New Delhi.

Media 
Movement participants have set up a number of media organizations to promote its core values such as love, tolerance, hope, dialogue, activism, mutual acceptance and respect. These media organs include TV stations (Samanyolu TV, Mehtap TV), (Ebru TV) (English), the newspapers Zaman, Today's Zaman (English), magazines and journals in Turkish like Aksiyon, Sızıntı, Yeni Ümit, The Fountain Magazine (English), Hira (Arabic), The International Cihan News Agency and the radio station .

Humanitarian aid 
The movement runs charity and humanitarian aid organizations which are transnationally active. The leading one among them is the Istanbul-based Kimse Yok Mu Association (KYM). KYM organizes charity campaigns to help those in need in different parts of the world. Like any other activities of the Gülen-movement, KYM runs local projects responding to specific needs. KYM holds UN Ecosoc Special status.

Another charity organization Embrace Relief was established in New Jersey and is active in the Americas, Asia and Africa.

Professional associations 
While being both praised and criticized for being market friendly, the Gülen movement has established various professional associations and business networks. Among them Istanbul based TUSKON is the major non-profit business confederation which states to promote economic solutions as well as social and political ones. Another one called TUCSIAD is based in China, in addition to DTIK's Asia-Pacific Group which supports the Gülen movement outside of Turkey in China, hoping to influence Turkish politics from the outside.

Criticism
Fethullah Gülen's and the Gülen movement's views and practices have been discussed in international conferences. In October 2007, in London a conference was sponsored by the University of Birmingham, the Dialogue Society, the Irish School of Ecumenics, Leeds Metropolitan University, the London Middle East Institute, the Middle East Institute and the School of Oriental and African Studies, University of London. Niagara Foundation of Chicago, together with several academic institutions, organized "The Gülen Movement: Paradigms, Projects and Aspirations" conference, which was held at University of Chicago on 11–13 November 2010.

In 2017, German magazine Der Spiegel called the movement a "secretive and dangerous cult" while calling Gülen a suspicious individual. Saying, "the movement calls itself a tolerant service movement, while those who have left the movement call it a secretive Islamist organization with Fethullah Gülen as its leader". The article said pupils attending the "cults" schools in Germany were under immense pressure from their abi's (tutors) who were telling them which books to read, which movies to watch, which friends to meet and whether to see their families or not. While the abi's were keeping a protocol of all those staying in the cult's dormitories.

Der Spiegel also criticized the movement regarding its activities towards freedom of the press. Despite Gülen emphasizing how much he cares of the freedom of the press in interviews, the movement launched a campaign towards the newspaper in 2012, after an article was written regarding the "cult", in which about 2000 readers wrote letters of complaint to the press council, all of which were alike each other, and which were all rejected. Der Spiegel said the movement distorted events, threatened those who spoke against it, and accused Der Spiegel of having ties to the Turkish mafia. While Gareth Jenkins of The Sunday Times said, despite portraying itself as a peaceful educational movement, the Gülen organization never hesitates using anti-democratic and anti-liberal methods.

The Süddeutsche Zeitung quoted a German lawyer calling the organization "more powerful than the Illuminati" and "not transparent as opposed to the claims", and reported that the organization tried to reorganize in Swabia region of Germany.

Bombing of Şemdinli Bookstore, 2005
On November 9, 2005, a bookstore was bombed in Şemdinli. The Prosecutor of the case, Ferhat Sarıkaya, prepared a criminal indictment in which Turkey's Commander of Land Forces Yaşar Büyükanıt was accused of forming a gang and plotting the bombing. A decade later, prosecutor Sarıkaya confessed that he was ordered by Gülenists to include General Yaşar Büyükanıt into the criminal indictment, in order to prevent his promotion in the army (Chief of General Staff) and to ease the grip on Gülenist structures within the army.

Assassination of Hrant Dink, 2007

The role of Gülen movement in the assassination of journalist Hrant Dink in Istanbul was brought to public attention. Hakan Bakırcıoglu, one of Hrant Dink's lawyers, said in an interview with Deutsche Welle that the underaged perpetrator, Ogün Samast, had help from third parties, including people connected to the Istanbul and Trabzon police forces.

Four prosecutors in the trial have been dismissed from their posts due to their ties with the movement, and for failing to make progress with the case. Furthermore, police commissioners Ramazan Akyürek and Ali Fuat Yılmazer were accused of not sharing their foreknowledge of the attack with the prosecutors, gendarmarie, or the intelligence services despite being briefed of a planned assassination several times.

Ergenekon trials, Sledgehammer trial, 2008

According to investigative journalist Nedim Şener, the Gülen movement used the assassination of Hrant Dink, the assassination of priest Andrea Santoro, the Zirve Publishing House murders as well as other events, to create an atmosphere and illusion of a clandestine Kemalist ultra-nationalist organization holding responsible for these misdeeds. With the start of the Ergenekon trials, this alleged organization was called "Ergenekon terrorist organization". The Gülenist media, in particular Taraf, Zaman and Samanyolu Haber TV, were instrumental in shaping the public opinion during these operations. In these court cases, military officials, parliamentarians and journalists were accused of plotting a violent coup to oust the government. It later turned out that these cases were based on fabricated evidence, and that most such fabrications were produced by the Gülenists in the police. In 2011, Nedim Şener was included to the Ergenekon trials for being member of Ergenekon and subsequently was arrested and held in pre-trial detention.

Redesigning of Turkish political landscape
Members of the Gülen movement inside the intelligence agency were accused of reshaping Turkish politics to a more "workable form" by leaking secretly filmed sex tapes and corruption tapes of both government members and opposition members, with the resignation of main opposition leader Deniz Baykal in 2010 as one of the most notable example. Politicians with no recorded scandalous behavior are believed to be killed like the Great Union Party leader Muhsin Yazıcıoğlu, who died in a helicopter crash in 2009.

Assassination of Andrei Karlov
Turkish officials declared the Gülen movement to be responsible for the assassination of Russian ambassador Andrei Karlov, while Russian officials accused the shooter of aiming to damage Russia–Turkey relations that had been normalizing since the 2016 Turkish coup d'état attempt.

Collaboration with the Kurdistan Workers' Party (PKK)
Since 2013 Gülen movement has been accused by the Turkish Government of collaborating with the Kurdistan Workers' Party (PKK). In 2014 the movement reportedly conducted several meetings with the PKK, in parts of Northern Iraq under PKK control. In 2015, Turkish Government said the movement had leaked the identity of 329 Turkish Gendermarie informants to the PKK. Who were then executed by the PKK.

On 15 April 2016, during the Kurdish–Turkish conflict Gülen movement member Brigadier General Ali Osman Gürcan deliberately sent 17 soldiers to a house that was packed with IEDs according to the testimony of his companions. Which led to the death of a police officer and wounding of eight soldiers. The house was marked on a map with the code 'P368' for IED's, which Gürcan erased from the map. Leading to a brawl that led to his companions calling him a "traitor". Gürcan later participated in 2016 Turkish coup d'état attempt under the Peace at Home Council. He was arrested after the coups failure and charged with life imprisonment.

Designation as a terrorist group
Gülen movement is deemed a designated terrorist group by the following countries and international organizations:
 , since May 2016
  Gulf Cooperation Council, since October 2016
 Organization of Islamic Cooperation, since October 2016
 , since December 2018

Northern Cyprus, recognised only by Turkey and considered by the international community to be part of the Republic of Cyprus, also designated the Gülen movement as a terrorist organization in July 2016.

In 2017, according to the Foreign and Commonwealth Office and to the British Parliament's Foreign Affairs Select Committee there was no "evidence to justify the designation of the Gülenists as a terrorist organisation by the UK". The same year, Gilles de Kerchove, EU Counter-terrorism Coordinator, said that the European Union didn't see the Gülen movement as a terrorist organisation and that the EU would need "substantive" evidence to change its stance. In 2018, in a conference with Turkish President Erdogan, German Chancellor Angela Merkel said that Germany needed more evidence to classify the Gülen movement as a terrorist organization.

Political involvement
According to academic researcher Svante E. Cornell, director of the Central Asia-Caucasus Institute & Silk Road Studies Program, "With only slight exaggeration, the ruling Justice and Development Party (AKP) as well as the government it has led could be termed a coalition of religious orders." "[...T]he Gülen movement stayed away from electoral politics, focusing instead on increasing its presence in the state bureaucracy. The Hizmet movement’s stated success in this regard would initially make it Erdoğan’s main partner, but also his eventual nemesis."

2002–2013 collaboration with the AKP 

From 2002 to 2013, the Gülen movement comprehensively collaborated with the Justice and Development Party (AKP) and Recep Tayyip Erdoğan in obtaining political power in Turkey.

Questions have arisen about the Gülen movement's possible involvement in the ongoing Ergenekon investigation, which critics have characterized as "a pretext" by the government "to neutralize dissidents" in Turkey. In March 2011, seven Turkish journalists were arrested, including Ahmet Şık, who had been writing a book, "Imamin Ordusu" (The Imam's Army), which states that the Gülen movement has infiltrated the country's security forces. As Şık was taken into police custody, he shouted, "Whoever touches it [the movement] gets burned!". Upon his arrest, drafts of the book were confiscated and its possession was banned. Şık has also been charged with being part of the stated Ergenekon plot, despite being an investigator of the plot before his arrest.

In a reply, Abdullah Bozkurt, from the Gülen movement newspaper Today's Zaman, said Ahmet Şık was not being an investigative journalist conducting "independent research", but was hatching "a plot designed and put into action by the terrorist network itself".

According to Gareth H. Jenkins, a Senior Fellow of the Central Asia-Caucasus Institute & Silk Road Studies Joint Center at Johns Hopkins University:

The Gülen movement has also been implicated in what the opposition Republican People's Party (CHP) – and after 2013 also President Recep Tayyip Erdoğan – have said were illegal court decisions against members of the Turkish military, including many during the Ergenekon investigation.

2013 AKP corruption scandal

On 17 December 2013, an investigation into stated corrupt practices by several bureaucrats, ministers, mayors, and family members of the ruling Justice and Development Party (AKP) of Turkey was uncovered, resulting in widespread protests and calls for the resignation of the government led by Prime Minister Recep Tayyip Erdoğan. Due to the high level of political influence by the Gülen movement in Turkey, it is rumored to be facilitated by the movement's influence on the Turkish police force and the judiciary, the investigation was said to be a result of a break in previously friendly relations between the Islamist-rooted government and the movement.

President Erdoğan and the AKP (the ruling party of Turkey) have targeted the movement since December 2013. Immediately after the corruption statements, the government subjugated the judiciary, media and civil society which were critical of the government's authoritarian trend in recent years. After the corruption statements surfaced, Erdogan labelled it as a "civilian coup" against his government. Since then, Erdogan has shuffled, dismissed or jailed hundreds of police officers, judges, prosecutors and journalists in the name of fighting against a "Parallel State" within the Turkish state.

Crackdown against the Gülen movement from 2014

On 14 December 2014, Turkish police arrested more than two dozen senior journalists and media executives connected with the Gülen movement on various charges.

A statement by the US State Department cautioned Turkey not to violate its "own democratic foundations" while drawing attention to raids against media outlets "openly critical of the current Turkish government".

EU Foreign Affairs chief Federica Mogherini and EU Enlargement Commissioner Johannes Hahn said that the arrests went "against European values" and "are incompatible with the freedom of media, which is a core principle of democracy".

On 20 January 2015, Turkish police launched raids in Ankara and three other cities, detaining some 20 people suspected of illegally eavesdropping on President Recep Tayyip Erdoğan and other senior officials. The suspects are linked to Turkey's telecommunications authority and to its scientific and technological research center TUBITAK. Local media said the move was aimed at the "parallel structure" — the term Erdogan uses to refer to Gülen's supporters in the judiciary, police and other institutions.

The Turkish government took over the Gülenist Zaman Daily, on 4 March 2016. Turkish police entered the Zaman's headquarters by force and fired tear gas at the protesting journalists and civilians. Hundreds of protestors were injured. In his efforts to eradicate the movement within the country the Turkish National Security Council has identified the movement as the "Gülenist Terror Organisation" ("Fethullahçı Terör Örgütü", FETÖ). The government has also been targeting individuals and businessmen who have supported the movement's organizations and activities.

Purge of movement in Turkey after July 2016

In reaction to the 15 July 2016 coup attempt, led by a military faction operating outside the chain of command, the Turkish government quickly stated the coup's leader to be Gülen. In following days and weeks, a massive crackdown affected all entities affiliated to the Gülen movements, from individuals to businesses, newspapers to schools and universities.

Following the assassination of Andrey Karlov, the Turkish government was reportedly investigating the assassin's links to the "Gülenist Terrorist Organisation" (FETÖ); in a speech, Turkish President Recep Tayyip Erdoğan said that the perpetrator was a member of FETÖ.

Prosecutions; extraditions to Turkey; political asylums granted 

Since the 2016 coup attempt, authorities arrested or imprisoned more than 90,000 Turkish citizens and closed more than 1,500 nongovernmental organizations, primarily for alleged ties to the Gülen movement.

In 2018, approximately 25,000 Turkish asylum requests were filed by alleged Gülenists in the European Union (a rise of 50% from 2017), with Germany's share 10,000 and Greece's about 5,000. Within the U.S., according to news reports, a number of Gülenists successfully receiving political asylum status are resettled in New Jersey.

In 2019 it was reported that Interpol had denied Turkey's appeals of the agency's rejections of Turkey's red notice requests regarding 464 fugitives, citing Interpol's legal definition of the 2016 Turkish coup d'état attempt as not terrorism but a failed military putsch.

, Turkey had successfully pressured a number of countries, especially those in Africa and the former Soviet Union, to extradite 
over 80 alleged Gülenists to Turkey.

Among Turkish citizens within Turkey convicted for alleged memberships in the Gülen movement are Turkey's honorary president of Amnesty International, Taner Kilic, and Amnesty's Turkish branch, Idil Eser, in July 2020.

Timeline
 1938 – Fethullah Gülen was born in the village of Korucuk in the Pasinler district of Erzurum, Turkey.
 1950s – Gülen's first meeting with people from the Nur Movement
 1960 – death of Said Nursî
 1979 – Science journal Sızıntı begins publication
 1982 – First "Gülen school" opens.
 1986 – Zaman, a daily newspaper in Turkey, begins publication, later becoming one of Turkey's top selling newspapers 
 1993 – A television channel opened in Turkey, Samanyolu TV.
 1994 – The (Turkish) Journalists and Writers Foundation (Gazeteciler ve Yazarlar Vakfi) established, with Gülen as honorary president
 1998 – Gülen meets with Pope John Paul II in the Vatican
 1999 – Gülen went to the United States because of the accusations in Turkey and many lawsuits filed against him and his health problems. Gülen currently resides in Saylorsburg, Pennsylvania.
 2004 – Establishment of Niagara Foundation
 2004 – Establishment of Kimse Yok Mu (Is Anybody There?), a charitable organization; 2010, receives "special" NGO status with United Nations Department of Economic and Social Affairs.
 2005 – Establishment of TUSKON (Turkish Confederation of Businessmen and Industrialists) 
 2007 – A news channel was opened in Turkey, Samanyolu Haber TV.
 2012 – Journalists and Writers Foundation (Gazeteciler ve Yazarlar Vakfi) receives "general consultative status" as a Non-Governmental Organization of the Economic and Social Council (ECOSOC) of the United Nations.

Further information
 
 
 
 
 
 
 
 
  - a review of former Hizmet participants' scholarly commentary about the movement

References

External links
 Altruistic Society or Sect? The Shadowy World of the Islamic Gülen Movement
 

Christian–Islamic–Jewish interfaith dialogue
 
Interfaith dialogue
Islam and politics
Islamism in Turkey
Islamic democracy
Sunni Islamic branches
Organisations designated as terrorist by Pakistan
Operation Gladio
Organizations designated as terrorist by Turkey
Sufi organizations